Unison Networks Limited (Unison) is an electricity distribution and fibre optic network company, based in Hastings, New Zealand.

Unison owns and manages the electricity lines network and the fibre optic network in the Hawke's Bay, Rotorua and Taupo regions. The service area covers 12,000 km2. The Unison group also provides electrical, fibre, civil, and vegetation contracting services; manufactures electrical products; and operates an insurance company.

Ownership
The company is 100% owned by the Hawke's Bay Power Consumers' Trust on behalf of electricity consumers in the Hawke's Bay area. The Trust is made up of five elected Trustees and operates under a Trust Deed.

Distribution network
The Unison subtransmission and distribution network is supplied from the national grid via Transpower substations. Seven Transpower grid exit points (GXPs) supply the Unison network: Redclyffe, Fernhill, and Whakatu for Napier-Hastings; Wairakei for Taupo; and Rotorua, Owhata, and Takurenga for Rotorua.

Network statistics

Network performance
Unison reported the normalised performance of the network for the 2014/15 year as follows:

History
Early in the twentieth century, electricity generation and distribution was managed by local councils or municipal departments. An electricity network was established in Hastings in 1912, with a power house in Eastbourne Street. Following changes to national legislation, the Hawke's Bay Electric Power Board was formed in 1924.

Subsidiaries
 Unison Contracting Services Limited
 Unison Energy Limited
 Unison Fibre Limited
 Unison Insurance Limited
 ETEL Limited

See also
 Electricity sector in New Zealand

References

External links
 Unison website

Electric power distribution network operators in New Zealand
Telecommunications companies of New Zealand
Companies based in Hastings
Hawke's Bay Region
New Zealand companies established in 1924
Energy companies established in 1924